Luka Drašković (born 1995) is a Montenegrin chess player. He was awarded the title of International Master in 2014.

Chess career
Drašković won the Montenegrin Chess Championship in 2021 and qualified for the Chess World Cup 2021, where he was defeated 2-0 by Aleksandar Inđić in the first round.

He has represented Montenegro in two Chess Olympiads:
 In 2016, where he scored 5/9 on board four.
 In 2018, where he scored 4½/9 on board four.

References

External links

Luka Drašković chess games at 365Chess.com

1995 births
Montenegrin chess players
Chess International Masters
Chess Olympiad competitors
Living people